Nowe Borsuki  is a village in the administrative district of Gmina Zatory, within Pułtusk County, Masovian Voivodeship, in east-central Poland.

References

	

Nowe Borsuki